Victor Assad Najjar (1914-2002) was a Lebanese-born American pediatrician and microbiologist at the Johns Hopkins Hospital, Vanderbilt University and Tufts University. Along with John Fielding Crigler, Najjar is known for Crigler–Najjar syndrome.

Life
He was born on 15 April 1914 in Beirut. He studied medicine at the American University in Beirut, graduating in 1935. Three years later he came to the United States and trained in pediatrics at the Johns Hopkins Hospital, then held a faculty appointment at the Johns Hopkins School of Medicine from 1949 to 1957. For the next ten years he was professor and chairman of the department of microbiology at Vanderbilt University School of Medicine in Nashville, Tennessee.

In 1968 he became professor of molecular biology at the Massachusetts Division of the American Cancer Society, and chief of the division of protein chemistry at Tufts University School of Medicine in Boston, Massachusetts. He was American Cancer Society Research Professor of Molecular Biology and Microbiology at Tufts University School of Medicine from 1978 to 1984.

Najjar died on 30 November 2002 in Nashville, Tennessee.

References

1914 births
2002 deaths
Lebanese emigrants to the United States
American pediatricians
American microbiologists
American University of Beirut alumni
Johns Hopkins School of Medicine alumni
Vanderbilt University faculty
Tufts University School of Medicine faculty